Josef Krämer (March 19, 1879 – July 25, 1946) was a German gymnast, track and field athlete, and tug of war competitor who competed in the 1906 Summer Olympics and in the 1908 Summer Olympics. He was born in Gelsenkirchen.

In 1906 he was part of the German team which won the gold medal in the tug of war competition. He also participated in the high jump event but his result is unknown.

As a member of the German gymnastics team he finished fifth in the team event. In the individual all-around of five events he finished seventh and in the individual all-around of six events he finished twelfth. Two years later at the 1908 Olympics he participated in the individual gymnastics all-around but his result in unknown.

References

External links
 

1879 births
1946 deaths
Sportspeople from Gelsenkirchen
German male artistic gymnasts
German male high jumpers
Olympic gymnasts of Germany
Olympic athletes of Germany
Olympic tug of war competitors of Germany
Gymnasts at the 1906 Intercalated Games
Gymnasts at the 1908 Summer Olympics
Athletes (track and field) at the 1906 Intercalated Games
Tug of war competitors at the 1906 Intercalated Games
Olympic gold medalists for Germany
Medalists at the 1906 Intercalated Games
19th-century German people
20th-century German people